The 2018 African Nations Championship, known as the 2018 CHAN for short and for sponsorship purposes as the Total African Nations Championship, was the 5th edition of the biennial association football tournament organized by the Confederation of African Football (CAF) featuring players from their respective national leagues. Originally supposed to be hosted in Kenya, it was instead hosted by Morocco from 13 January to 4 February 2018.

The tournament's then-most successful team and defending champions, DR Congo, failed to qualify for this edition following their qualification loss to neighboring Congo via the away goals rule. Hosts Morocco defeated Nigeria 4–0 in the final to win their first title.

Host selection
Following the conclusion of the final of the previous edition in Rwanda on 7 February 2016, CAF announced Kenya as the host nation of the next edition 48 hours later. However, CAF decided to change the host nation on 23 September the following year due to a lack of progress with preparations and open up a new tender process for a replacement team with the deadline of 30 September 2017. The countries who submitted to replace Kenya as hosts are:

The Ethiopian Football Federation did not provide the government's letter of guarantee and were not considered; the CAF Emergency Committee decided on 15 October that year to choose Morocco over Equatorial Guinea.

Qualification

The qualification rounds took place from 20 April to 20 August 2017.

Since Morocco had already qualified in the Northern Zone before replacing Kenya as hosts, their spot in the main phase was re-allocated to their opponents in the Northern Zone final qualifying round, Egypt. However, Egypt declined to participate citing a "congested domestic calendar". As a result, the spot was reverted to Central-East Zone (as originally three teams would participate including oringinal-turned-stripped hosts Kenya), and would go to the winner of a play-off in November 2017 between Ethiopia and Rwanda, the two teams which lost in the Central-East Zone final qualifying round.

Qualified teams
The following teams qualified for the group stage of this edition of the tournament:

Venues
This edition of the tournament had matches held in Casablanca, Marrakech, Agadir and Tangier.

Before Kenya was stripped of its hosting rights, its football association planned to use 4 stadiums for this edition of the tournament. However, only Nyayo National Stadium in Nairobi and Kasarani Stadium in Kasarani were considered to meet hosting requirements after inspections by CAF, while Mombasa Municipal Stadium in Mombasa and Kinoru Stadium in Meru did not.

Squads

The squads of the participating teams each consisting of 23 players per the tournament's regulation article 72 were announced by CAF on 10 January 2018.

Match officials
A total of 32 match officials (16 referees and 16 assistant referees) were selected for this edition of the tournament, of which 7 were selected to operate the video assistant referee (VAR) system in a CAF competition for the first time ever, beginning at the knockout stages.

Draw
The draw for the group stage was held at Sofitel Rabat in the Moroccan capital, Rabat, on 17 November 2017 at 19:30 WET (UTC±0).

The teams were drawn into 4 groups of 4. The hosts Morocco were seeded in Group A. The remaining teams were seeded based on their results in the four most recent editions of the tournament: 2009 (multiplied by 1), 2011 (multiplied by 2), 2014 (multiplied by 3), 2016 (multiplied by 4):
7 points for winner
5 points for runner-up
3 points for semi-finalists
2 points for quarter-finalists
1 point for group stage

Based on the formula above, the 4 pots were allocated as follows:

Group stage
The top two teams of each group advance to the knockout stage.

Tiebreakers
Teams are ranked according to points (3 points for a win, 1 point for a draw, 0 points for a loss), and if tied on points, the following tiebreaking criteria are applied, in the order given, to determine the rankings (Regulations Article 74):
Points in head-to-head matches among tied teams;
Goal difference in head-to-head matches among tied teams;
Goals scored in head-to-head matches among tied teams;
If more than two teams are tied, and after applying all head-to-head criteria above, a subset of teams are still tied, all head-to-head criteria above are reapplied exclusively to this subset of teams;
Goal difference in all group matches;
Goals scored in all group matches;
Drawing of lots.

All times are local, WET (UTC±0).

Group A

Group B

Group C

Group D

Knockout stage
From this stage onward, the video assistant referee (VAR) system  would make its debut in a CAF competition. Extra time and penalty shoot-out were used if necessary to decide the winner, except for the third-place match where penalty shoot-out and no extra time was used if necessary to decide the winner per the competition's regulations article 75.

Bracket

Quarter-finals

Semi-finals

Third place match

Final

Goalscorers
9 goals
 Ayoub El Kaabi

3 goals

 Saleh Al Taher
 Augustine Mulenga

2 goals

 Walid El Karti
 Zakaria Hadraf
 Junior Makiesse
 Gabriel Okechukwu
 Anthony Okpotu
 Walaa Eldin Musa
 Seif Teiri
 Lazarous Kambole

1 goal

 Job
 Vá
 Mohamed Sydney Sylla
 Patrick Moussombo
 Carof Bakoua
 Kader Bidimbou
 Amor
 Saïdouba Bissiri Camara
 Sékou Amadou Camara
 Ibrahima Sory Sankhon
 Salem Ablo
 Elmutasem Abushnaf
 Zakaria Alharaish
 Abdulrahman Khalleefah
 Achraf Bencharki
 Ismail Haddad
 Salaheddine Saidi
 Vetunuavi Hambira
 Absalom Iimbondi
 Panduleni Nekundi
 Rabiu Ali
 Sunday Faleye
 Dayo Ojo
 Thierry Manzi
 Omer Suleiman
 Derrick Nsibambi
 Fackson Kapumbu

Awards
The following awards were given at the conclusion of the tournament:

Team of the Tournament

Substitutes: Anas Zniti (Morocco), Sand Masaud (Libya), Vá (Angola), Bader Hasan (Libya), Augustine Mulenga (Zambia), Saifeldin Bakhit (Sudan), Ismail El Haddad (Morocco)

Man of the match

Tournament team rankings

References

External links
 (archived) at CAFOnline.com

2018 African Nations Championship
African Nations Championship
2018 in African football
January 2018 sports events in Africa
February 2018 sports events in Africa
2017–18 in Moroccan football
International association football competitions hosted by Morocco